Pembrokeshire was a parliamentary constituency based on the county of Pembrokeshire in Wales.  It returned one Member of Parliament (MP) to the House of Commons of the Parliament of the United Kingdom, elected by the first past the post system.

History 
The Laws in Wales Act 1535 (26 Hen. VIII, c. 26) provided for a single county seat in the House of Commons for each of twelve historic Welsh counties (including Pembrokeshire) and two for Monmouthshire. Using the modern year, starting on 1 January, these parliamentary constituencies were authorised in 1536. In practice, the first known Knights of the Shire from Wales (as Members of Parliament from county constituencies were known before the nineteenth century) may not have been elected until 1545.

The Act contains the following provision, which had the effect of enfranchising the shire of Pembroke.

	And that for this present Parliament, and all other Parliaments to be holden and kept for this Realm, one Knight shall be chosen and elected to the same Parliaments for every of the Shires of Brecknock, Radnor, Mountgomery and Denbigh, and for every other Shire within the said Country of Dominion of Wales;

Before the Reform Act
During the late eighteenth and early nineteenth century the representation of the county was subject to a series of contests between the Owen family of Orielton, who supported the Whig interest, and the Philipps family of Picton Castle.

The Great Reform Act to the First World War

During this period the seat was largely held by the Conservatives who held off the Liberal challenge which was so apparent in other parts of Wales. When Lord Emlyn inherited the title Earl of Cawdor in 1860 the seat was held  until 1866 by George Lort Phillips. He was succeeded by James Bevan Bowen of Llwyngwair who stood down in favour of Sir John Scourfield in 1868. Scourfield died in 1876 and Bowen once again became the county member. In 1880, however, he was defeated by William Davies and the Liberals held the seat until 1918.

The Twentieth Century

The constituency was abolished for the 1997 general election, when its territory was divided between the new constituencies of Preseli Pembrokeshire and Carmarthen West & South Pembrokeshire. Up to 1950 it was generally considered a Liberal seat, although won by the Conservatives on some occasions. From 1950 it was regarded as a fairly safe Labour seat. However, the Conservatives won the seat in 1970 when the sitting Labour MP Desmond Donnelly left the party and formed The Democratic party. Donnelly lost the seat but polled well. In subsequent elections the Conservative vote held up, tending to suggest that Donnelly had held the seat with large majorities for Labour based on his own popularity as much as being the Labour candidate.

Boundaries
The constituency was established with the boundaries of the county of Pembrokeshire, but by the time of abolition Fishguard and Northern Pembrokeshire had been joined to the neighbouring Cardigan (UK Parliament constituency) constituency to form Ceredigion and Pembroke North, which was captured by Plaid Cymru in 1992. This left Pembrokeshire with the major towns of Haverfordwest, Milford Haven, Pembroke Dock and Tenby.

Members of Parliament

MPs 1545–1601

MPs 1601–1832

MPs 1832–1997

Elections

Elections in the 1830s

Owen's elected was declared void on petition, causing a by-election.

Elections in the 1840s

Elections in the 1850s

Elections in the 1860s
Campbell succeeded to the peerage, becoming Earl Cawdor and causing a by-election.

Phillips' death caused a by-election.

Elections in the 1870s

Scourfield's death caused a by-election.

Elections in the 1880s

Elections in the 1890s 

Davies resigned after being appointed Attorney general of the Bahamas, requiring a by-election.

Elections in the 1900s

Elections in the 1910s 

General Election 1914–15:

Another General Election was required to take place before the end of 1915. The political parties had been making preparations for an election to take place and by the July 1914, the following candidates had been selected; 
Liberal: Walter Roch
Unionist: Edward Marlay Samson

Elections in the 1920s

Elections in the 1930s 

opposed to National Government.

Elections in the 1940s 
General election 1939–40:
Another general election was required to take place before the end of 1940. The political parties had been making preparations for an election to take place from 1939 and by the end of this year, the following candidates had been selected; 
Liberal: Gwilym Lloyd George
Labour: William James Jenkins

Supported the National Government. The Liberal Party had left the war coalition.

Elections in the 1950s

Elections in the 1960s

Elections in the 1970s

Elections in the 1980s

Elections in the 1990s

References

Sources
 The House of Commons 1509–1558, by S.T. Bindoff (Secker & Warburg 1982)
 

Politics of Pembrokeshire
Historic parliamentary constituencies in South Wales
Constituencies of the Parliament of the United Kingdom established in 1536
Constituencies of the Parliament of the United Kingdom disestablished in 1997